This is a timeline of women's suffrage in Montana. The fight for women's suffrage in Montana started early, before Montana became a state. In 1887, women gained the right to vote in school board elections and on tax issues. In the years that followed, women battled for full, equal suffrage, which culminated in a year-long campaign in 1914 when they became one of eleven states with equal voting rights for most women. Montana ratified the Nineteenth Amendment on August 2, 1919 and was the thirteenth state to ratify. Native American women voters did not have equal rights to vote until 1924.

19th century

1880s 
1883

 First women's suffrage speech is given in Montana by Frances Willard.
1884

 Women's suffrage is proposed during the state constitutional convention by Judge W. J. Stephens of Missoula, but it is not accepted.

1887

 Clara McAdow requests aid for women's suffrage organization from suffragists in the east of the United States.
 March 8: Women gain the right to vote in school board elections in their own districts.

1889

 Women's suffrage is proposed at the Montana State Constitutional Convention.
 Petitions to the convention for women's suffrage came from Jefferson County and Madison County.

1890s 
1890

 Women's suffrage club formed in Helena.

1895

 May: Emma Smith DeVoe comes to Montana to organize chapters of the National American Woman Suffrage Association (NAWSA).
 September: A suffrage convention is held in Helena with Carrie Chapman Catt as a speaker.
 The Montana Woman's Suffrage Association (MWSA) is formed.
 A women's suffrage bill for a constitutional amendment is proposed in the state House, but fails in the Senate.
1896

 DeVoe returns to Montana to continue organizing clubs and getting more women interested in suffrage.
 November: MWSA holds their annual convention in Butte.
 November 20: Ella Knowles Haskell becomes the president of MWSA.
1897

 November: MWSA holds their annual convention in Helena.
 Formation of an Equal Suffrage Party.

1898

 February 16: Haskell speaks at the National American Woman Suffrage Association (NAWSA) Conference held in Washington, D.C.
 November 1: MWSA holds their annual convention in Helena with Catt speaking.
 Suffragists ask all state legislative candidates to explain their positions on women's suffrage.
1899

 A women's suffrage bill was introduced to the state legislature through the lobbying of Mary B. Atwater, but it never makes it out of committee.
 October: MWSA convention is held in Helena with Catt and Mary Garrett Hay attending.

20th century

1900s 
1900

 Fall: Helena women lobby Republican, Democratic and Populist party conventions to include a women's suffrage plank.

1902

 Carrie Chapman Catt returns to Montana and brings Gail Laughlin and Laura A. Gregg to reorganize suffrage groups.
1903

 A women's suffrage amendment is introduced in the Montana legislature, but it doesn't pass.
1905

 Another women's suffrage amendment is introduced in the legislature, but it doesn't pass again.

1910s 
1911

 Jeannette Rankin becomes the first woman to address the Montana Legislature when she speaks to the Senate on women's suffrage.
 Suffragists host a women's suffrage booth at the Montana State Fair.

1912

 The Montana Equal Suffrage Association (MESA) is created.
 Suffragists again host a women's suffrage boot at the Montana State Fair.
1913

 A women's suffrage bill passes in the Montana Legislature and is sent to the voters in 1914.
 Jeannette Rankin travels from Montana to Washington, D.C. by car, collecting signatures in support of women's suffrage along the way.
 October: The Montana WCTU decides to focus solely on women's suffrage for the next year.
 December: WCTU paper, Woman's Voice, starts publishing again.

1914

 The Suffrage Daily News is published in Helena.
 January: MESA opens headquarters in Butte.
 Spring: James Lees Laidlaw and Wellington D. Rankin found a Montana chapter of the National Men's Suffrage League.
 May 2: Governor Sam Stewart declares "Woman's Day" on May 2. A suffrage car parade held on Last Chance Gulch in Helena.
 June: Jeannette Rankin gives a speech at the meeting of the Montana Federation of Women's Clubs (MFWC) in Lewistown. MFWC came out in support of women's suffrage.
 September 24: The Montana State Fair has a women's suffrage booth.
 November 3: The women's suffrage amendment passed 41,302 to 37,588. Montana is now one of eleven states to give women the vote.
1915

 January: Suffragist meeting in Helena to discuss "intelligent use of the ballot." Women change the name of their suffrage groups to the Montana Good Government Association.

1919

 August 2: Montana ratifies the Nineteenth Amendment, becoming the thirteenth state to ratify.

1920s 
1924

 The Indian Citizenship Act is passed, providing rights for Native Americans to vote in Montana.

See also 

 List of Montana suffragists
 Women's suffrage in Montana
Women's suffrage in states of the United States
 Women's suffrage in the United States

References

Sources

External links 
 Timeline of women in Montana politics

Montana suffrage
Timelines of states of the United States
Suffrage referendums
History of Montana
Timelines of women in history